The 2013 Kansas Lottery 300 was the 29th stock car race of the 2013 NASCAR Nationwide Series and the 13th iteration of the event. The race was held on Saturday, October 5, 2013, in Kansas City, Kansas at Kansas Speedway, a 1.500 miles (2.414 km) permanent paved oval-shaped racetrack. The race took the scheduled 200 laps to complete. At race's end, Matt Kenseth, driving for Joe Gibbs Racing, would hold on to the lead by fuel strategy to win his 28th career NASCAR Nationwide Series win and his second and final win of the season. To fill out the podium, Paul Menard of Richard Childress Racing and Regan Smith of JR Motorsports would finish second and third, respectively.

Background 

Kansas Speedway is a 1.5-mile (2.4 km) tri-oval race track in Kansas City, Kansas. It was built in 2001 and hosts two annual NASCAR race weekends. The NTT IndyCar Series also raced there until 2011. The speedway is owned and operated by the International Speedway Corporation.

Entry list 

 (R) denotes rookie driver.
 (i) denotes driver who is ineligible for series driver points.

Practice

First practice 
The first practice session was held on Friday, October 4, at 1:10 PM CST, and would last for one hour and five minutes.

Second and final practice 
The second and final practice session, sometimes referred to as Happy Hour, was held on Friday, October 4, at 2:40 PM CST, and would last for one hour and 20 minutes.

Qualifying 
Qualifying was held on Saturday, October 5, at 11:05 AM CST. Each driver would have two laps to set a fastest time; the fastest of the two would count as their official qualifying lap.

Two drivers would fail to qualify: Chase Miller and Joey Gase.

Full qualifying results

Race results

Standings after the race 

Drivers' Championship standings

Note: Only the first 10 positions are included for the driver standings.

References 

2013 NASCAR Nationwide Series
NASCAR races at Kansas Speedway
October 2013 sports events in the United States
2013 in sports in Kansas